Rubel Castle (also known as Rubelia) was established in Glendora, California, by Michael Clarke Rubel (April 16, 1940 – October 15, 2007) and is owned and operated by the Glendora Historical Society.

In 1959, Rubel purchased a 1.7 acre citrus orchard on which the structure resides. He and his friends completed construction in 1986.
Rubel Castle was constructed partly out of concrete, as well as nontraditional materials including scrap steel, rocks, bedsprings, coat hangers, bottles, and other repurposed materials that Rubel salvaged from the neighborhood as ranches and barns were giving way to tract houses.

Chickens and other animals are frequently sighted.

Background

In 1959, Rubel bargained for the defunct Albourne Rancho property and took up residence in the citrus packing house. Rubel's father, Henry "Heinz" Scott Rubel, had been an Episcopal priest and gag writer for Joe Penner, a radio comedian and movie star. In the 1960s, Rubel's mother, one-time Broadway actress and Greenwich Village Follies dancer Dorothy Deuel Rubel, moved into the packing house with her son. She used the venue to throw parties. Guests arrived weekly by the hundreds, arriving inside a tin fruit packing house which had been transformed into a giant dance hall. Inside, surrounded by art and antique furniture remaining from Rubel ancestors, they mingled and danced to a small orchestra. The parties led to the packing house becoming known as "The Tin Palace."

Notable people who visited "The Tin Palace" in that time include Sally Rand, Dwight Eisenhower, Vivian Duncan of the Duncan Sisters, Woody Strode, Beatrice Kay, Harry Townes, Bob Hope, Jack Benny, Kid Chissell, Angie Dickinson, and Alfred Hitchcock.

Fellow castle builder "Colonel" Jirayr Zorthian was a supporter and friend involved in the project.

Construction of the castle

Though Rubel slept in one of the giant citrus refrigerators, the walls of thick cork were not sufficient sound insulation to allow him peace from his mother's parties. Beginning in 1968, Rubel began building a small get-away house in the empty 1,000,000 gallon concrete reservoir, using cement and discarded champagne bottles. The walls of the reservoir provided privacy and a noise barrier while he built the bottle house. The project lasted 20 years, culminating in what is now called the Rubel Castle.

Past 1968, with the help of his friends and close family, the castle grew to be thousands of square feet with towers five stories high.  Rubel and his associates built the structure without architectural plans, utilizing salvaged river rock, cement, steel, aluminum, telephone poles and wine bottles.  Old motorcycles, tires, sand-filled rubber gloves, a camera, a golf club and a toaster are some of the items that protrude from the castle.

In the middle of the property sit a 1940s-era Santa Fe caboose, as well as old trucks and tractors. There is also a cemetery with rejected marble tombstones, but it contains no graves.

Legacy
Huell Howser interviewed Rubel for Videolog in 1990 and, after Michael's passing, his nephew Scott, in 2011.

The castle has hosted royalty including Prince Philip. Some other notable guests have been former President Dwight D. Eisenhower, Henry Kissinger, the Archbishop of Canterbury Robert Runcie, and Governor George Deukmejian.

In March 2005, Rubel donated the Castle to the Glendora Historical Society.

Many television programs, music videos, and movies have been filmed on castle grounds, including NBC's Heroes, Our Flag Means Death, and T-mobile's Frankenstein commercial.

Rubel Castle was added to the National Register of Historic Places in 2013.

Gallery

See also

 Antoni Gaudí, a Catalan architect with a similar style, particularly the Sagrada Família in Barcelona.
 Hermit House, a unique residence located in Herzliya, Israel with intricate mosaics constructed by one man over thirty years.
 Mystery Castle, a house in Phoenix, Arizona built in the 1930s in a similar style.
 Nitt Witt Ridge, a house in Cambria, California constructed in a similar style.
 Ferdinand Cheval, a French postman who constructed an "ideal palace" out of rocks in his spare time.
 Grandma Prisbrey's Bottle Village, another folk art environment built with recycled materials.
 Watts Towers, a famous landmark in Los Angeles built from concrete and discarded materials.
 Lummis House, a historic home built out of river rocks and concrete, also in Los Angeles.

References

External links
  Glendorahistoricalsociety.org: Rubel Castle tour information
 The Shriek: A newsletter of Rubel Castle
 Huell Howser Videolog: Rubel's Castle
 Rubelia, building and other adventures for dummies

Castles in California
Glendora, California
Houses in Los Angeles County, California
Historic house museums in California
Museums in Los Angeles County, California
Houses on the National Register of Historic Places in California
Buildings and structures on the National Register of Historic Places in Los Angeles County, California
Outdoor sculptures in Greater Los Angeles
Stone houses in the United States
Visionary environments
Eclectic architecture
Rustic architecture in California